Astronomical instruments include:

the Antikythera mechanism, an astronomical clock

Radio plate

See also
Astronomy
Outline of astronomy
Surveying instrument
Measurement instrument

Instruments

Historical scientific instruments